The 1919 New Jersey gubernatorial election was held on November 4, 1919. Democratic nominee Edward I. Edwards defeated Republican nominee Newton A.K. Bugbee with 49.20% of the vote.

Republican primary

Candidates
Newton A.K. Bugbee, State Comptroller and former Chairman of the New Jersey Republican Party
Warren C. King, businessman and President of the New Jersey Manufacturers' Council
Thomas Lynch Raymond, Mayor of Newark
William N. Runyon, State Senator and acting Governor

Results

Democratic primary

Candidates
Edward I. Edwards, State Senator
Frank M. McDermitt, attorney and perennial candidate from Newark
James R. Nugent, City Counsel for Newark and Chairman of the Essex County Democratic Party (1903–25)

Results

General election

Candidates
Major party candidates
Edward I. Edwards, Democratic
Newton A.K. Bugbee, Republican

Other candidates
Albert Farr, Socialist
Charles E. Lane, Prohibition Party
John C. Butterworth, Socialist Labor Party of America
Mark M. Denterfass, Single Tax

Results

References

1919
1919 New Jersey elections
New Jersey
November 1919 events